Dolichoderus gagates is a species of ant in the genus Dolichoderus. Described by Emery in 1890, the species is endemic to multiple countries, including Bolivia, Brazil, French Guiana, Guyana, Suriname and Venezuela.

References

Dolichoderus
Hymenoptera of South America
Insects described in 1890